is a Japanese politician serving his sixth term in the House of Representatives in the Diet (national legislature) as a member of the Liberal Democratic Party. A native of Yokohama, Kanagawa and graduate of Waseda University, he was elected for the first time in 1986 after an unsuccessful run in 1983, both as a member of the now-defunct party New Liberal Club.

A 15-year reporter for the Mainichi Shimbun, Suzuki began his career in politics as a secretary for Yōhei Kōno, the current Lower House speaker.  Regarded as a close associate of Kono, Suzuki has been heavily involved in education and environment issues, including efforts to revise the Fundamental Law of Education under Shinzō Abe.  Although he announced in October 2007 his intention to retire from politics at the end of this term, Suzuki was selected by Yasuo Fukuda on August 1, 2008, as the cabinet's new Minister of Education, Culture, Sports, Science and Technology.

References

External links
  Official website in Japanese.

1941 births
Living people
21st-century Japanese politicians
Culture ministers of Japan
Education ministers of Japan
Liberal Democratic Party (Japan) politicians
Members of the House of Representatives (Japan)
New Liberal Club politicians
People from Yokohama
Science ministers of Japan
Sports ministers of Japan
Technology ministers of Japan